Freakazoid! is an American animated series that lasted 24 episodes in two seasons from 1995 to 1997.  Freakazoid! lasted one complete season and part of a second season on its premiere network, Kids' WB, from September 9, 1995, until February 14, 1997, when it was cancelled due to low ratings. However, the show was later picked up by Cartoon Network and was rebroadcast on April 5, 1997 and ended on March 29, 2003.

This list shows both seasons. The episodes here are organized by the air dates in which the episodes were shown with their segments in their originally produced order (for example, the episode "Statuesque" actually premiered on November 29, 1996, with its respective segments in a different order, but its airdate is given as June 6, 1997, the airdate in which it was shown with its segments in the original order). Most episodes were written by Paul Rugg and the directors for each cartoon varied.

Series overview

Episodes

Season 1 (1995–96)

The segments indicate in colors by which characters starred in them:
Blue = Toby Danger (1 segment)
Yellow = Lord Bravery (2 segments)
Red = The Lawn Gnomes (1 segment)
Green = The Huntsman (2 segments)
Purple = Fatman and Boy Blubber (1 segment)

Season 2 (1996–97)

References

External links
 

Freakazoid!